Donacia cincticornis is a species of aquatic leaf beetle in the family Chrysomelidae. It is found in the Caribbean Sea, Central America, and North America.

Subspecies
These three subspecies belong to the species Donacia cincticornis:
 Donacia cincticornis cincticornis
 Donacia cincticornis tenuis Schaeffer
 Donacia cincticornis tryphera Schaeffer

References

Further reading

 

Donaciinae
Articles created by Qbugbot
Beetles described in 1838